Roger Lamonte Lewis Jr. (born November 27, 1993) is a former American football wide receiver. He played college football at Bowling Green. In 2016, Lewis was signed as an undrafted free agent by the New York Giants.

Early life
Lewis attended Pickerington High School Central in Pickerington, Ohio. He became a star football player at the school and he earned scholarship offers from 17 Division I schools. During his senior year in 2012, Lewis was charged with two counts of rape. It was alleged that he raped a classmate in the basement of another classmate's house on December 2, 2011. The second charge alleged that Lewis raped the same classmate again in the back seat of her car on January 6, 2012. A jury acquitted Lewis of the first charge and deadlocked on the second charge, resulting in the judge declaring a mistrial. Lewis avoided a retrial by pleading guilty to making false statements to Pickerington police. The guilty plea to falsification resulted in the rape charge being dismissed. Lewis was sentenced to three years on probation. Afterwards, he opted to attend Jireh Preparatory Academy, a post-high-school college-prep school in Matthews, North Carolina.

College career
After spending one season at Jireh Preparatory Academy, Lewis committed to play college football at Bowling Green State University on January 6, 2014. In two seasons at Bowling Green, Lewis caught 23 touchdown passes and collected 2,637 receiving yards. He was named first team All-MAC in 2014 and 2015. In 2015, he was a semifinalist for the Biletnikoff Award and was the winner of the Paul Warfield Award. On January 11, 2016, Lewis announced his decision to enter the 2016 NFL Draft.

College statistics

Professional career

New York Giants
After going undrafted in the 2016 NFL Draft, Lewis was signed by the New York Giants as an undrafted free agent. The signing of Lewis was officially announced on May 6, 2016.

Lewis was able to work his way up the depth chart after beginning his rookie season as the 7th receiver, and was able to split time with Victor Cruz throughout the season. On October 16, 2016, he made his first career catch for a 24-yard touchdown reception against the Baltimore Ravens. On November 6, 2016, he caught a 30-yard touchdown pass from Eli Manning to help his team to a 28-23 victory over the Philadelphia Eagles. He earned his first career start in place of an injured Victor Cruz against the Cincinnati Bengals on November 14, 2016, and finished the game with two catches for 2 yards.

Lewis started the 2017 season as the Giants' No. 4 receiver behind Odell Beckham Jr., Brandon Marshall and Sterling Shepard. In Week 6, Lewis was forced into the starting role after Beckham and Marshall suffered season-ending injuries the previous week and Shepard was sidelined with an injury from the same game.

On September 1, 2018, Lewis was waived by the Giants.

Tennessee Titans
On October 10, 2018, Lewis was signed to the Tennessee Titans practice squad. He signed a reserve/future contract with the Titans on December 31, 2018. On May 7, 2019, Lewis was released.

Indianapolis Colts
On July 30, 2019, Lewis was signed by the Indianapolis Colts. He was released on August 31, 2019.

References

1993 births
Living people
People from Pickerington, Ohio
Players of American football from Ohio
American football wide receivers
Bowling Green Falcons football players
New York Giants players
Tennessee Titans players
Indianapolis Colts players